"Pretty (Ugly Before)" is a song by American singer-songwriter Elliott Smith. It was released as a limited-edition 7" vinyl single in 2003 by record label Suicide Squeeze, Smith's final single released during his lifetime. It was later re-released by Domino in 2004, and appeared on Smith's posthumous final album, From a Basement on the Hill.

The song features (post-bridge) backing vocals from Smith's former Heatmiser bandmate Sam Coomes.

Release 

"Pretty (Ugly Before)" was released as a limited-edition 7" vinyl single in 2003 by record label Suicide Squeeze. The single did not chart in the United States. It was re-released in 2004 by record label Domino, reaching number 85 in the UK Singles Chart, and appeared on Smith's posthumous final album, From a Basement on the Hill. An alternate version of the single's B-side, "A Distorted Reality Is Now a Necessity to Be Free", also appears on the album.

Recording 
"Pretty (Ugly Before)" was recorded at Fort Apache Studios in Cambridge, Massachusetts, by engineer Matthew Ellard and assisted by Andrew Beckman, while Elliott was on tour with his band.  Beckman recalls "Elliott was very shy at first and kept his distance.  Once we started talking about gear, he opened up quickly.  He was excited about the Line 6 delay pedal he was using for the backwards delay at the end of the song.  During the first take, I gave him a huge thumbs up and he couldn't help but smile."

The Mellotron-like keyboard part during the intro was created using a Casio SK-1 sampler, which the keyboard player Aaron Embry sang one note into then spread the sample out across the keyboard.  Because the SK-1 has no internal storage, he had to do this every time he wanted to use the sound.  "I remember scrambling around trying to find a combination of adapters that would allow us to get a mini sized output from the Casio into our Neve 8078 console.  Thankfully we got it working, as the sound is haunting and a perfect intro to this amazing tune," remembered Beckman.

Smith recorded his vocals alone in the control room on a Neumann U67 mic while the band and crew enjoyed a dinner in the adjacent kitchen.  As accomplished as he was, he was still anxious about recording vocals in front of people.

Track listing

References 

Elliott Smith songs
2003 singles
2004 songs
Songs written by Elliott Smith